A tomato omelette (native name in Marathi = टॉमॅटो धिरडे) is a breakfast dish prepared mostly in Maharashtra. It is referred to as an omelette because of its visual appearance,  but actually contains no egg product or by-product and is actually vegan . The main ingredient is chickpea flour  or besan.
Sometimes, it is also made with dosa batter (rice flour and urad dal paste), with a small quantity of besan only to provide binding, in which case it is classified as Uttapam.

A batter of pouring consistency is made with water and the flour; with finely chopped green chillies, onions and tomatoes added. The mix is poured on a hot skillet, brushed with cooking oil and cooked on both sides. Tomato omelettes are served hot with ketchup, coconut chutney, sambar or any other pickle.

It has a popularity and easy availability amongst multitudes of restaurants, canteens throughout Maharashtra namely in cities like Pune, Mumbai. It is a popular dish amongst University Canteens, like VJTI and Pune University. While this filling breakfast snack is available across the country, it is generally prepared in Maharashtrian homes along with other similar filling breakfast snacks such as thalipeeth or dhirde.

See also
 Omelette
 Indian omelette
 Cheela, Indian pancake
 List of tomato dishes

References

External links
http://aahaaramonline.com/2015/02/20/tomato-omelette-vegetarian-omelet-maharashtra-recipe/ 
http://aahaaramonline.com/category/indian-food/maharashtrian-recipes/page/8/ 
http://www.aayisrecipes.com/breakfast-or-snacks/tomato-omelet-vegetarian
http://chakali.blogspot.in/2008/03/tomato-omelette_07.html

Maharashtrian cuisine
Omelettes
Pancakes
Vegetable dishes
Vegetarian cuisine
Tomato dishes